Anna Zíková (born 13 May 1998) is a Czech ice hockey player,  playing in the Finnish Naisten Liiga (NSML) with HPK Kiekkonaiset. She began the 2022–23 season with Göteborg HC, however the club withdrew from the Swedish Women's Hockey League (SDHL) in early November 2022. Her college ice hockey career was played with the Maine Black Bears women's ice hockey program in the Hockey East (HEA) conference of the NCAA Division I during 2017 to 2021. 

As a member of the Czech national team, she participated in the Top Division tournaments of the IIHF Women's World Championship in 2016, 2017, and 2019, and in the Division I Group A tournament in 2015.

References

External links
 
 Anna Zíková at Hokej.cz 

1998 births
Living people
Czech expatriate ice hockey players in Finland
Czech expatriate ice hockey players in Sweden
Czech expatriate ice hockey players in the United States
Czech women's ice hockey defencemen
Göteborg HC players
HPK Kiekkonaiset players
Maine Black Bears women's ice hockey players
People from Český Těšín
Sportspeople from the Moravian-Silesian Region